Sir Henry Peake (1753–1825) was a shipbuilder and designer to the Royal Navy who rose to be Surveyor of the Navy.

Life
He was born in 1753 in (or close to) Portsmouth. He joined the Royal Navy in May 1762 aged only 9, as an apprentice ship's carpenter. "Henry Peake" who is noted as Master Boat Builder at Portsmouth Dockyard in 1762 clearly cannot be the same person and this is probably his father. The Royal Navy list his works from 1779 when he became Master Shipwright at Sheerness Dockyard.

In June 1806 he replaced Sir John Henslow as Surveyor of the Navy, working alongside Sir William Rule. Hos position as Surveyor of the Navy was filled by Ropert Seppings in 1813 but he did not officially retire until 1822.

He was knighted by the Prince Regent on 25 June 1814. Peake died in 1825.

Family

He was married to Sarah Ladd. They had several sons who became eminent Royal Navy officers:

Admiral Thomas Ladd Peake (1782-1865)
Commander William Peake (1780-1813) killed on HMS Peacock
James Peake
Commander Henry Frederick Peake

Ships built

HMS Polyphemus (1782) 64-gun ship of the line launched at Sheerness
HMS Europa (1783) 50-gun ship of the line launched at Woolwich
HMS Vanguard (1787) 74-gun ship of the line launched at Deptford
HMS Grampus (1802) 50-gun ship of the line launched at Portsmouth
HMS Colossus (1803) 74-gun ship of the line launched at Deptford
Royal Sovereign (1804) unarmed yacht launched at Deptford
HMS Hebe (1804) 32-gun frigate launched at Deptford
HMS Arrow (1805) 14-gun schooner launched at Deptford
HMS Minerva (1805) 32-gun frigate launched at Deptford

Ships designed

Note: dates in brackets represent date of design not launch)

HMS Brunswick (1786) 74-gun ship of the line launched in 1790
HMS Bermuda (1806) 10-gun sloop
Cherokee-class brig-sloop (1807) a series of over one hundred 10-gun sloop
HMS Rapid (1808) 16-gun sloop
Pygmy-class schooner (1809) 10-gun schooner
Vesuvius-class sloop (1812) 10-gun sloop equipped as a bomb vessel
Fury-class sloop (1813) 12-gun sloop equipped as a bomb vessel
HMS Waterloo (1813) 80-gun ship of the line launched in 1818

References
 

1825 deaths
Surveyors of the Navy
1753 births